The Santana 26 is an American trailerable sailboat that was designed by W. D. Schock Corp's in-house designer, Seymour Paul, as a cruiser and first built in 1971.

Production
The design was built by W. D. Schock Corp in the United States, from 1971 until 1974, with 83 boats completed over its four-year production run.

Design
The Santana 26 is a recreational keelboat, built predominantly of fiberglass, with wood trim. It has a masthead sloop rig, a raked stem, a nearly-plumb transom, a spade-type rudder controlled by a tiller and a fixed fin keel or optional swing keel.

The boat is normally fitted with a small outboard motor for docking and maneuvering.

The design has sleeping accommodation for four people, with a double "V"-berth in the bow cabin and a drop-down dinette table that forms double berth on the port side. The galley is located on the starboard admidships. The galley is equipped with a two-burner stove, ice box and a  sink. The head is located just aft of the bow cabin on the port side.

For sailing the design cane be equipped with a number of jibs or genoas.

Variants
Santana 26
This fixed keel model was introduced in 1971. It displaces  and carries  of ballast.
Santana 26 SK
This swing keel model was also introduced in 1971. It displaces , carries  of ballast and has a mast that is about  shorter than the fixed keel model.

See also
List of sailing boat types

References

External links
Photo of a Santana 26

Keelboats
1970s sailboat type designs
Sailing yachts
Trailer sailers
Sailboat type designs by Seymour Paul
Sailboat types built by W. D. Schock Corp